Holoșnița is a commune in Soroca District, Moldova. It is composed of two villages, Cureșnița and Holoșnița.

Notable people
 Nicolae Bulat
 Demir Dragnev

Gallery

References

Communes of Soroca District
Populated places on the Dniester